The Akhmad Kadyrov Mosque is located in Grozny, the capital of Chechnya. The mosque is one of the largest in Russia and is officially known as "The Heart of Chechnya".

The mosque is named after Akhmad Kadyrov, the first president of the Republic of Chechnya and father to the current president of the Republic, Ramzan Kadyrov. The construction of the mosque was commissioned by the mayor of the Turkish city of Konya. The mosque's design includes a  set of -tall minarets which are based upon those of the early seventeenth century Sultan Ahmed Mosque (known also as the Blue Mosque) in Istanbul.

On October 16, 2008, the mosque was officially opened in a ceremony in which Chechen leader Ramzan Kadyrov appeared and conversed with Russian Prime Minister Vladimir Putin.

The mosque is located on the picturesque banks of the Sunzha River in the middle of a huge park (14 hectares) and is part of an Islamic architectural complex, which in addition to the mosque, consists of the Russian Islamic University, the Kunta-Haji, and the Spiritual Administration of Muslims of the Republic of Chechnya.

The mosque design is executed in the classic Ottoman style, as exemplified in the architecture of Istanbul. The central hall of the mosque is covered with a huge dome (diameter - 16 meters, height - 32 m). The height of the four minarets is 62 meters, making them among the tallest in southern Russia. The exterior and interior walls of the mosque are built of marble and travertine, while the interior is decorated in white marble.

The area of the mosque is 5000 square metres and which allows a capacity of more than 10000 people. The same number of the faithful can pray in the mosque adjacent to the summer gallery.

Features

In the construction of the mosque, the latest techniques and the most modern technologies were employed to create a building that is nonetheless thoroughly in keeping with the aesthetic of traditional Islamic architecture of the Ottoman golden age. The exterior and interior walls are of marble-travertine, and the temple interior is richly decorated with white marble, mined in the Marmara Adasi island in the Sea of Marmara (near Balikesir, Turkey).
In the traditional painted ornamentation of the interior, both the synthetic and the natural pigments used were made resistant to fading and peeling with special additives designed to preserve the brilliance and durability of the colours for at least 50 years. Gold of the highest quality was used to render the ornamental calligraphy displaying verses from the Quran.

There are in total 36 chandeliers. Their forms are inspired by - and intended to recall - the three holiest sites of Islam - 27 of them based upon the form of the Dome of the Rock in Jerusalem's Temple Mount compound, 8 modelled upon the Green Dome of Medina's Masjid al-Nabawi and the largest, measuring no fewer than 8 meters in diameter, designed as a homage to the Kaaba in Mecca itself. Several tons of bronze and 2.5 kg of the highest quality gold were needed in order to create the chandeliers, which contain more than a million pieces crafted from Swarovski crystals in Turkey and featuring traditional Chechen decorative motifs.

The prayer niche in the qiblah wall of the mosque is 8 meters high and 4.6 meters wide and made of white marble. The niche creates the illusion of an infinite deepening of intersecting spaces. Calligraphy displaying verses from the Quran are skillfully woven into the overall pattern of the architectural decoration of the mosque. The main dome is inscribed with Surah 112 "al-Ikhlâs": "Say: He is God, the Single, Indivisible - God, the Eternal, Absolute. He begets not nor is He begotten - And there happens to be not a single one equal to Him."

The area of the mosque is 5000 m², height of minarets - 63 meters. The total area of the Islamic Center - 14 acres.

The temple has a high seismic resistance. The adjacent area has multiple fountains and an alley.

Russia 10

In 2013, Russia hosted the "Russia 10" competition, designed by a popular vote to decide what are the ten greatest visual symbols of Russia. After the mosque took second place at the end of the second round of the competition, the head of Chechnya, Ramzan Kadyrov announced that he would withdraw the mosque from participation in the competition. The head of Chechnya was forced to take such a step by the results of the voting, which, in his opinion, did not correspond to the actual number of votes cast. “We have every reason to be sure that the votes cast for the Heart of Chechnya mosque by the millions were not taken into account, despite the fact that the money went to the accounts of the operators MegaFon and Beeline,” Ramzan Kadyrov said. Throughout the entire voting, the Heart of Chechnya Mosque was in the lead among the participants, but on the last day it lost first place to the Kolomna Kremlin. More than 36.8 million votes were cast for the Heart of Chechnya and near to 37.5 million for the Kremlin.

The head of the republic Ramzan Kadyrov, offended by the results of voting on the Internet, announced a boycott of the federal mobile operators "Beeline" and "Megaphone". After that, unknown individuals threw eggs at the offices of these companies in Grozny.

Trivia
In this mosque, ten thousand Muslims can pray at a time. This means that the statement of mosque being the largest in Russia is not true, as e.g. Makhachkala Grand Mosque in Dagestan has space for 15,000 to 17,000 worshipers.

In 2015, Gabon issued a commemorative coin with the image of CHF 1,000 mosques and Akhmat Kadyrov.

See also
Islam in Russia
List of mosques in Russia
List of mosques in Europe

References

Mosques completed in 2008
Buildings and structures in Grozny
Ottoman mosques
21st-century mosques
Mosques in Russia